"Time in a Bottle" is a song by singer-songwriter Jim Croce. He wrote the lyrics after his wife Ingrid told him she was pregnant in December 1970. It appeared on Croce's 1972 ABC debut album You Don't Mess Around with Jim and was featured in the 1973 ABC made-for-television movie She Lives! After he was killed in a plane crash in September 1973, the song was aired frequently on radio, and demand for a single release built. The single of "Time in a Bottle" became Croce's second and final track to reach number 1 in the United States.

Production and arrangement
The arrangement features a harpsichord that producer Tommy West discovered had been left in the mixing studio.

Reception
Cash Box magazine called the song "a sweet, tender ballad filled with Croce’s magical vocal touch".

"Time in a Bottle" was the third posthumous Billboard number-one hit after "Sittin' on the Dock of the Bay" by Otis Redding and "Me and Bobby McGee" by Janis Joplin. 

After the single finished its two-week run at the top of the charts in early January 1974, the album You Don't Mess Around with Jim became No. 1 for five weeks. 

In 1977, Time in a Bottle was chosen as the title of a compilation album of Croce's love songs.

Track listing
7" Single (ABC-11405)
 "Time in a Bottle" – 2:24
 "Hard Time Losin' Man" – 2:23

Charts and certifications

Weekly charts

Year-end charts

All-time charts

Certifications

In popular culture
The song was performed on a 1977 episode of The Muppet Show.
 The song was used in television commercials for Mateus wine in 1983.
The song was sung by Leslie Chow (Ken Jeong) and Alan Garner (Zach Galifinakis) in an elevator in The Hangover Part II.
The song was featured in X-Men: Days of Future Past in a slow-motion sequence showcasing the character Peter Maximoff/Quicksilver.
In 2016, Apple released an iPhone 6s commercial called "Timer" which played some of "Time in a Bottle"; the commercial also features Sesame Streets Cookie Monster interacting with Siri.

References

External links
 Lyrics of this song
 

1973 singles
Jim Croce songs
Lena Horne songs
Glen Campbell songs
Billboard Hot 100 number-one singles
Cashbox number-one singles
RPM Top Singles number-one singles
Songs released posthumously
Songs written by Jim Croce
Songs about death
ABC Records singles
1972 songs